Brøgger is a Norwegian surname which may refer of:

Anton Wilhelm Brøgger (printer) (1820–1882), Norwegian book printer.
Anton Wilhelm Brøgger (archaeologist) (1884–1951), Norwegian archaeologist.
Niels Christian Brøgger (1914–1966), Norwegian writer
Jan Brøgger (1936–2006), Norwegian anthropologist
Suzanne Brøgger (1944-), Danish writer
Waldemar Christofer Brøgger (geologist) (1851–1940), Norwegian geologist
Waldemar Christofer Brøgger (writer) (1911–1991), Norwegian writer

Danish-language surnames
Norwegian-language surnames